The coat of arms of Saint Pierre and Miquelon is the official heraldic symbol of the French overseas collectivity of Saint Pierre and Miquelon. It was designed by Léon Joner.

Description
The main part of the shield is blue with a yellow ship, said to represent the Grande Hermine, which brought Jacques Cartier to Saint Pierre on June 15, 1536. Three square flags placed along the top recall the origin of most inhabitants of the islands, from left to right, Basques,  Bretons, and Normans.  It is crowned with a naval crown.

The unofficial flag of Saint Pierre and Miquelon recapitulates elements of the coat of arms.

See also
Flag of Saint Pierre and Miquelon
Flag of France
National emblem of France

References

External links

 

Saint Pierre and Miquelon
Saint Pierre and Miquelon culture
Saint Pierre and Miquelon
Saint Pierre and Miquelon
Saint Pierre and Miquelon
Saint Pierre and Miquelon